Stephen Winston Duke-McKenna (born 17 August 2000) is a footballer who plays as a midfielder for League Two side Leyton Orient on loan from  club Queens Park Rangers. Born in England, he represents Guyana internationally.

Club career
He was raised in Everton youth teams, joining aged 11 and made one bench appearance for the senior team on 7 December 2017 in a Europa League game against Apollon Limassol.

On 15 June 2018, he signed a pro contract with Bolton Wanderers. He played in the Professional Development League for Bolton Wanderers Development Squad in the 2018–19 season.

On 27 August 2019 Duke-McKenna signed for Queens Park Rangers and will be part of the Development squad.

He joined Hemel Hempstead Town on a one-month loan deal in October 2020.

On 17 April 2021, he made his Queens Park Rangers debut in a 2–1 away win against Middlesbrough, coming on as a substitute in the 86th minute.

On 21 January 2022, Duke–McKenna joined National League side Torquay United on loan for the remainder of the 2021–22 season.

International
He was called up to the Guyana national football team in October 2018. He made his debut for Guyana on 20 November 2018 in a CONCACAF Nations League qualifier against French Guiana as a 74th-minute substitute for Colin Nelson. on 30 May 2019, Duke-Mckenna was named to Guyana's squad for the 2019 CONCACAF Gold Cup.

Career statistics

References

External links
 
 

2000 births
Footballers from Liverpool
English people of Guyanese descent
Living people
English footballers
Guyanese footballers
Guyana international footballers
Association football defenders
Everton F.C. players
Bolton Wanderers F.C. players
Queens Park Rangers F.C. players
Hemel Hempstead Town F.C. players
Torquay United F.C. players
National League (English football) players
English Football League players
2019 CONCACAF Gold Cup players